Blepharomastix saponalis is a moth in the family Crambidae. It was first described by Achille Guenée in 1854. It is endemic to French Guiana.

References

Moths described in 1854
Blepharomastix